The Innbach is a river in Upper Austria with a length of approximately . Its source is near Gaspoltshofen at the foot of the  hills and empties into the Danube at Wilhering.

Due to its high volume, many mills were once located along the Innbach.

The Innbach is populated with many species of fish, among them: brown trout, brook trout, bullhead, minnow, grayling, gudgeon, rainbow trout, chub, barbel, roach, rudd, spirlin, perch, nase, dace, bleak, carp, bream, burbot, pike, zander, and catfish.

References

External links
Upper Austria Fishery Federation
WWF Riverwatcher

Rivers of Upper Austria
Rivers of Austria